Mordellistena bambyrea is a beetle in the genus Mordellistena of the family Mordellidae. It was described in 1955 by Franciscolo.  It is endemic to Senegal.

References

bambyrea
Beetles described in 1955